Xia Jingru (1893 – 7 July 1974) was a Chinese educator and politician. She was among the first group of women elected to the Legislative Yuan in 1948.

Biography
She became headmistress of Tianjin Private Shenggong Girls' High School and Tianjin Renai Nursing School, and founded schools in Tianjin, Qingdao and Jinan.

Xia was a Kuomintang candidate in Tianjin in the 1948 elections for the Legislative Yuan and was elected to parliament. She relocated to Taiwan during the Chinese Civil War and remained a member of the Legislative Yuan until her death in 1974.

References

1893 births
Jinan University alumni
Chinese schoolteachers
Members of the Kuomintang
20th-century Chinese women politicians
Members of the 1st Legislative Yuan
Members of the 1st Legislative Yuan in Taiwan
1974 deaths